The 1958 Minnesota lieutenant gubernatorial election took place on November 4, 1958. Incumbent Lieutenant Governor Karl Rolvaag of the Minnesota Democratic-Farmer-Labor Party defeated Republican Party of Minnesota challenger Bernard E. Ericsson.

Results

External links
 Election Returns

Minnesota
Lieutenant Gubernatorial
1958